Cedarhurst is a station on the Long Island Rail Road's Far Rockaway Branch in Cedarhurst, in Nassau County, New York, United States. The station is located at Cedarhurst Avenue and Chestnut Street, one block west of Central Avenue.

History

Cedarhurst station was originally built by the South Side Railroad of Long Island in July 1869. Three years later, the rival Long Island Rail Road also built its own "Ocean Point Depot" in July 1872 for the former Cedarhurst Cut-Off just northeast of Cedarhurst station After the LIRR acquired the South Side Railroad, both the Ocean Point Depot and the LIRR's depot were abandoned in June 1876. The LIRR's old station was moved to Far Rockaway in August 1881, while the SSRRLI's Ocean Point Depot re-opened in June 1887, then was greatly re-modeled in May 1888. A third Cedarhurst station was built in 1913.

Station layout
This station has two high-level side platforms, each 10 cars long.

References

External links 

1872 Cedarhurst Station (c. 1905) (Arrt's Arrchives)
 Station from Washington Avenue from Google Maps Street View
 Platforms from Google Maps Street View
Postcard of Cedarhurst Station (Cedarhurst at 100; September 16, 2010 - Five Towns Local History blog)

Five Towns
Long Island Rail Road stations in Nassau County, New York
Railway stations in the United States opened in 1869
1869 establishments in New York (state)